"The Unicorn" is a song written by Shel Silverstein. It was originally released in 1962 on his album Inside Folk Songs (Atlantic 8072).

Background
The lyrics to the song also appear, printed as a poem, based on the biblical tale, Noah's Ark, in Shel Silverstein's book Where the Sidewalk Ends. In the original version of the song, the Irish Rovers speak half of the lyrics, as well as the part of the fourth chorus.  The final line is spoken freely without music: "And that's why you'll never see a Unicorn to this very day".

Irish Rovers recording

"The Unicorn" was made very popular by the Irish Rovers in 1968. It remains one of the best-known songs in the Irish Rovers' long career. It sold 8 million copies worldwide and in their native Ireland, the song peaked at #5 on the Irish Singles Chart. In addition, the song was nominated for  Best Folk Performance at the  1969 Grammy Awards. Elsewhere, "The Unicorn" peaked at #4 in Canada, and in the US, reached #2 on the US Adult Contemporary Chart, and #7 on the Hot 100.

Other cover versions
Silverstein's songbook, "Dirty Feet" (TRO/Hollis Music, 1969), includes a discography saying that, along with the Irish Rovers and Silverstein's versions, "The Unicorn" had been recorded by 
Bill Anderson (Decca)
Shay Duffin (RCA)
Robert Goulet (Columbia)
Bob Turner (ABC)
Uncle Bill" (Dot). (The record "Uncle Bill Socks It To Ya" was by Burt Wilson, imitating W.C. Fields)
Will Millar of the Irish Rovers recorded another, earlier version of the song with the St. Michaels Kids. In 1981 Millar opened an Irish pub in Toronto under the name The Unicorn.
Kidsongs used the song for Good Night Sleep Tight, but had to leave out the sad part to make it more kid-friendly.

Description
According to the song, the unicorn was not a fantasy, but a creature that literally missed the boat by not boarding Noah's Ark in time to be saved from the Great Flood described in the Bible. They are said to be the loveliest of all animals but also silly.

References

1968 singles
Songs written by Shel Silverstein
Children's songs
American folk songs
Decca Records singles
MCA Records singles
Festival Records singles
Number-one singles in Australia
Song recordings produced by Jerry Wexler
Atlantic Records singles
Noah's Ark in popular culture
Songs about fictional characters
Songs about floods
Songs about horses
1962 songs
Fictional unicorns
The Bachelors songs